Pal Sinn Lap-man (born 17 March 1959) is a Hong Kong musician, singer and actor.

Sinn is noted for his roles as Sai-Mun Hing in The Reincarnation of Golden Lotus, for which he received Hong Kong Film Award nomination for Best New Performer.

Life

Early life
Sinn was born and raised in Hong Kong, where he attended the Lung Cheung Government Technical Secondary School in the early 1970s.

Career
At 16, Sinn began his career as a singer at a bar on Lockhart Road, Wanchai, Hong Kong.

In 1986, Sinn joined Chyna, a heavy metal rock band founded by Donald Ashley.  After the band was disbanded, then he founded the Blue Jeans with  but Blue Jeans was disbanded in 1990.

He had his first experience in front of the camera in 1986, and he was chosen to act as a support actor in Jeffrey Lau's Operation Pink Squad, an action film starring Sandra Ng,  Ann Bridgewater, Elsie Chan, and Charlie Cho.

For his role as Sai-Mun Hing in The Reincarnation of Golden Lotus (1989), Sinn was nominated for the Hong Kong Film Award for Best New Performer. That same year, he participated in Tai Kit Mak's All Night Long, a story film starring Carol Cheng, Shui-Fan Fung, Elizabeth Lee, Elsie Chan, Crystal Kwok, and Wu Ma. Then he appeared as a fast food restaurant staff in Clarence Fok's The Iceman Cometh, the film stars Yuen Biao, Yuen Wah, and Maggie Cheung.

He co-starred with Michelle Monique Reis, Natalis Chan and Iwanbeo Leung in Yuen Cheung-Yan's Coup De Grace (1990). Sinn also filmed in Love Is Love, alongside Stephen Chow, Suki Kwan, Sandra Ng, and Sing Fui On.

In 1991, Sinn played Hussein, who is a gambler, in Wong Jing's God of Gamblers II, an action film starring Andy Lau, Stephen Chow, and Ng Man Tat. That same year, he starred as Sai-Mun Hing in The Golden Lotus 'Love and Desire''', based on the novel The Golden Lotus by Lanling Xiaoxiaosheng.

In 1992, Sinn portrayed Gao Ya'nei, the son of Grand Marshal Gao Qiu, in All Men Are Brothers – Blood of the Leopard, adapted from Shi Nai'an's classical novel The Water Margin. The film also stars Tony Leung, Joey Wang, and Elvis Tsui.

In 1993, Sinn had a minor role as Da Jiaoban in Wong Jing's City Hunter, which starred Jackie Chan, Chingmy Yau, Joey Wang, and Richard Norton.

In 1994, Sinn starred in a historical film called Fire Dragon with Brigitte Lin, Max Mok, and Sandra Ng, directed by Yuen Woo-ping. He played the lead role in Whatever You Want, opposite Jordan Chan, Anita Yuen, and Law Kar-ying.

In 1995, Sinn appeared as Julian in Detective Investigation Files II, he also participated in its sequel Detective Investigation Files IV (1999).

In 2007, Sinn was cast in Ho-Cheung Pang's Exodus, a suspense film starring Simon Yam, Irene Wan, and Nick Cheung.

Sinn had a cameo appearance in Dream Home (2010), which starred Eason Chan as Zheng Lichang's lover (played by Josie Ho).

In 2011, Sinn acted in the romantic comedy film Lan Kwai Fong.

In 2012, Sinn had a supporting role in The Silent War, a film adaptation based on the novel Plot'' by Mai Jia.

Personal life
In the 1980s, Sinn fell in love with Anita Mui.

Sinn began dating Paisley Wu in 1996, and they married in 2008.

Instruments
Pal Sinn has played a number of basses in his music career, such Tune, Fodera and Bacchus.

Filmography

Film

Television

Discography

Albums

Awards

References

External links

1959 births
Living people
20th-century Hong Kong male actors
20th-century Hong Kong male singers
21st-century Hong Kong male actors
21st-century Hong Kong male singers
Cantopop artists
Chinese rock singers
Hong Kong male film actors
Hong Kong male television actors
Hong Kong rock musicians
TVB veteran actors